Modjadji Head Kraal is a village situated at the foot of the escarpment in the Limpopo province of South Africa.

References

Populated places in the Greater Letaba Local Municipality